Christopher George Vacher (born 3 December 1951) is a British television presenter, best known as a long-serving main anchor of BBC West's flagship regional news programme Points West for 28 years.

Early life
Brought up near Axminster on the Somerset-Devon border, Vacher attended Sherborne School and the Britannia Royal Naval College, Dartmouth (in the same year as Prince Charles) before joining the Royal Navy in 1969 as a seaman officer.

Broadcasting career
Vacher joined the BBC in 1981 working for Radio Bristol before becoming a freelance reporter and newsreader for Points West a year later. He joined the main presenting team in 1983 and holds the record as the programme's longest serving main presenter. Vacher, a past winner of the Royal Television Society's 'Regional TV Personality of the Year in the West' award, has also worked on various documentary specials as part of the regional current affairs series Close Up West.

Vacher presented Points West for the final time on Friday 9 December 2011. Vacher was then the longest-serving regional presenter who had worked for the BBC.

Private life 
Vacher is married and has two sons from his first marriage to Tilly.

References

External links
 

Living people
BBC newsreaders and journalists
English television presenters
1951 births